Stan Tomlins (22 November 1923 – 25 June 2004) was an Australian rules footballer who played for Richmond in the Victorian Football League (VFL).

Tomlins, a Hampton Amateur, was the centre half back in Sandringham's 1946 premiership team, their first ever in the VFA. He spent a lot of the next season up forward and won the J. J. Liston Trophy.

After crossing to Richmond without a clearance, Tomlins made his debut in the opening round of the 1948 VFL season and kicked two goals. He managed bags of four goals in his next two games and also kicked five goal haul in round 15, against Melbourne. A shoulder injury, suffered that season, finished his career.

Throughout the 1960s until his retirement in 1971, Tomlins was a well-known umpire in Victorian country leagues.

References

Holmesby, Russell and Main, Jim (2007). The Encyclopedia of AFL Footballers. 7th ed. Melbourne: Bas Publishing.

1923 births
2004 deaths
Richmond Football Club players
Sandringham Football Club players
J. J. Liston Trophy winners
Australian rules football umpires
Australian rules footballers from Victoria (Australia)